Radstadt (Central Bavarian: Rodstoud or Rodstod) is a historic town in the district of St. Johann im Pongau in the Austrian state of Salzburg.

Geography

The town is part of the Salzburg Pongau region. It is located in the valley of the Enns River, near the confluence with its Taurach tributary, at the foot of Roßbrand mountain, part of the Salzburg Slate Alps. In the east, the Ennstal road leads to Schladming in Upper Styria.

The municipal area comprises the cadastral communities of Höggen, Löbenau, Mandling, Radstadt proper, and Schwemmberg.

History
In the 4th century before the Common Era the area was settled by Celtic tribes, their Noricum kingdom was incorporated as a Roman province about 15 BC. The road across the Tauern Pass was part of a major Roman road, leading from Aquileia in Italy to the city of Iuvavum (present-day Salzburg) in the north.

A place called Rastat (i.e. "resting place") was already mentioned in a 1074 deed. The fortress of Radstadt was founded in the 13th century, when the Pongau region became part of the Archbishopric of Salzburg and border conflicts arose with the Habsburg dukes of Styria; it received city rights in 1289. The town served as seat of the local administration and was of significant value for the protection of the Enns Valley and the road crossing the Alpine crest via Radstädter Tauern Pass towards Carinthia and Aquileia. Radstadt has a Gothic church consecrated in 1417, and a town hall dating from 16th century. 

In the German Peasants' War of 1524/25, the citizens sided with Prince-Archbishop Matthäus Lang von Wellenburg and resisted a siege by a peasants' army of about 5,000 men led by Michael Gaismair. The city walls are preserved, including three towers which the besiegers were forced to erect after their defeat. in 1629 the prince-archbishops established a Capuchin monastery here to spread the Counter-Reformation in the Enns Valley. As in many other Salzburg areas under the rule of Archbishop Leopold Anton von Firmian, the Protestant population was expelled in 1731/32; as Exulanten they were granted asylum by the Prussian king Frederick William I and settled in the Gumbinnen region of East Prussia.

Today Radstadt is also a popular tourism resort, with more tourists annually than the year-round population. It features its own ski area, and is part of an extended downhill ski and snowboard region (Ski Amadé) with links with the neighbouring town of Altenmarkt.

Politics

Seats in the municipal assembly (Stadtsenat) as of 2014 elections
 10 Austrian People's Party (ÖVP)
 7 Social Democratic Party of Austria (SPÖ)
 4 Freedom Party of Austria (FPÖ)

Notable people
 Paul Hofhaimer (1459–1537), composer 
 Putzi Frandl (born 1930), alpine ski racer
 Michael Walchhofer (born 1975), alpine ski racer

References

Cities and towns in St. Johann im Pongau District
Salzburg Slate Alps
Radstadt Tauern